The Abruzzo regional election of 2005 took place on 3–4 April 2005.

Ottaviano Del Turco (Italian Democratic Socialists, then Democratic Party) defeated incumbent Giovanni Pace (National Alliance) by a landslide.

Results

Source: Ministry of the Interior

2005 elections in Italy
Elections in Abruzzo
April 2005 events in Europe